The German Class 41 steam locomotives were standard goods train engines (Einheitslokomotiven) operated by the Deutsche Reichsbahn (DRB) and built from 1937 to 1941.

History 
In the search for a new, fast, goods train locomotive, the Deutsche Reichsbahn-Gesellschaft (DRG) in 1934 was attracted by the proposal from the Berliner Maschinenbau (BMAG, formerly Louis Schwartzkopff) for a 2-8-2 (1'D1'h2) engine. The design, produced by Friedrich Wilhelm Eckhardt (1892–1961), differed from the DRG's original requirement for a 2-8-0 (1'D) engine, because the required performance with an 18-ton axle load was easier to generate on a 2-8-2 engine rather than one with a 2-8-0 wheel configuration. Continued adherence to this instruction would in the end have given the new engine no significant advantage over the Prussian goods train locomotives which were to be withdrawn. The Reichsbahn Central Office Engineering Works (RZM) eventually agreed to this proposal; the BMAG was tasked to develop the proposed design and produce two prototypes.

In January 1937 the two prototype locomotives, 41 001 and 41 002, were delivered to the DRG, who subsequently tested them thoroughly and bought them. The prototypes soon proved themselves, with their power, performance and quiet riding qualities, as well as their exceptional acceleration.

In developing the Class 41, the principle of having standard locomotives (Einheitsloks) demonstrated the financial advantages of standardization. For example, the construction costs of the engine, through the use of components from the simultaneously developed Class 03, 06 and 45 engines, was under 10,000 Reichsmarks.

From October 1938, the first full-scale production Class 41 locomotives were ordered by the now renamed (since February 1937)  Deutsche Reichsbahn (DRB). All the well-known locomotive manufacturers in Germany participated in the building of the locomotives, including BMAG, Borsig, Maschinenfabrik Esslingen, Henschel & Sohn, Arnold Jung Lokomotivfabrik, Krauss-Maffei, Krupp, Orenstein & Koppel and Schichau.

Unlike the prototype locomotives, corner valve pressure compensators were omitted from the production locos and Nicolai pressure compensating tubular valves (later Karl Schultz valves) were used to give a better ride when running light. On the valve gear, the normal lifting link (Hängeeisen) replaced the Kuhn slides of the prototypes which were expensive to manufacture.

As with Classes 03, 45 and 50, the   boiler made of St 47 K steel, which aged and embrittled rapidly, soon caused major problems. In this way the wear and tear on the boiler could at least be slowed.

The axle load of the locomotive could be switched between 18 t and 20 t by inserting bolts into different sockets in the equalising beams. This was supposed to enable the locomotive to be more versatile in its use. Little or no use was made of this flexibility however. The Deutsche Bundesbahn and East German DR later left the bolts in the 18 t setting.

The locomotives were, with the exception of the prototypes, coupled to 2'2'T34 tenders. The prototypes, 41 001 and 41 002, had 2'2'T32 tenders on delivery. From their use of 20m turntables, it is also known that some engines were running with 2'2T30 tenders.

The advent of war increasingly stifled the purchase of fast goods train locomotives until, in January 1941, the existing orders were cancelled completely. On 2 June 1941, MF Esslingen delivered the last Class 41 locomotive, no. 41 352, to the DRB. With that a total of 366 engines of this class had been built in just under four years.

Preserved locomotives 
After the Second World War, 216 engines went into the Deutsche Bundesbahn fleet and 122 were left in the hands of the DR in East Germany. There is evidence that 22 additional locomotives were left in the former Reichsbahn railway division of Breslau in Poland, and were later incorporated into the Polish State Railways (PKP) as Ot 1-1 to Ot 1-19. Number 41 153 was listed on the books of the Czechoslovakian State Railways (CSD) after 1945. Number 41 034 as well as other locomotives (41 076, 41 082 and 41 312) from locomotive convoys (reparations) were left in the territory of the Soviet State Railway (SZD) and later transferred to the PKP. The fate of other locomotives is unknown.

As a result of the two prototype locomotives being used at Schneidemühl (present-day Piła) locomotive shed to carry express cattle trains to Berlin, the engines were unflatteringly christened Ochsenlok (Oxen loco).

DB rebuild 

Because the boiler of these engines suffered from metal fatigue, they began to be repaired in the 1950s. Between 1957 and 1961, 107 vehicles were fitted with fully welded boilers, like those installed on the Class 03.10. In addition the front part of the frame and the running plate were changed. Forty examples were converted to oil-firing with heavy oil. From 1968, these were designated as Class 042. The last Class 042 steam locomotives were retired in 1977 at Rheine locomotive shed. The photograph (right) shows one as a museum loco, now reclassified to Class 41 (the pre-1968 designation).

The former DB locomotives, 41 105 and 41 241, have been preserved as representatives of their class by Stoom Stichting Nederland in the Netherlands. Number 41 018, an operational loco owned by the Munich Steam Locomotive Company, is stabled at the Augsburg Railway Park and 41 113 is exhibited in the Technical Museum at Sinsheim. The Osnabrück Steam Engine Friends are working hard to restore 41 052 to operational status, after it had stood for a long time as a monument at Osnabrück-Schinkel. Number 41 096 is preserved as operational loco at Klein-Mahner. Number 41 360 is operated by the Dampflok-Tradition Oberhausen e.V. Since the end of ban on steam locomotives, she has provided a comprehensive programme of journeys on the Deutsche Bahn's railway network.

 41 018 oil-fired  Dampflok-Gesellschaft München e.V.
 41 096 oil-fired  Dampflok-Gemeinschaft 41 096 e.V.

DR Class 41 and DR Rekolok 

The DR too had difficulties with boilers made of St 47 K steel. The reduction of boiler overpressure from 20 to 16 bar had certainly slowed their susceptibility to damage, but could not prevent it entirely. Of the 112 locomotives recorded in the DR fleet in 1955, only 12 had already been equipped with a '1943 Type' replacement boiler and were therefore safe. Problems with the St 47 K boilers, however, increased massively. Repair welding did not produce the desired effect, but made the material even more brittle and the danger of cracks developing and boiler explosions was greater than before. And it was not just the Class 41 that was affected. Classes 03, 03.10 and 50, with boilers made of non-aging St 47 K, were also prone to damage. As a result of increasing difficulties the DR had to withdraw over 300 locomotives from service in 1956 which abruptly led to an enormous shortage of engines. The urgent call for action which then resulted led at last to the development and subsequent ordering of a new boiler (later called the 39E) that, with a few minor alterations, was also usable on locomotive classe 03, 03.10 and 39.

Because the delivery of the new boilers kept being delayed, 21 Class 41 locomotives were simply fitted with replacement boilers to the old design by January 1959. Even the Meiningen repair shop made a complete copy of the old boiler for 41 075. Other damaged boilers were fully repaired and many parts replaced.

Regardless of that, DR engineers worked on a "reconstruction programme for the recovery of the steam locomotive fleet." This envisaged, amongst other things, the modernisation of 102 Class 41 locomotives. The German term used for reconstruction was Rekonstrucktion or Reko for short, hence the subsequent designation of the locomotives as Rekolokomotiven or Rekoloks.

Demarcation disputes, disagreements over the detail of the reconstruction programme and the continued non-delivery of the Reko boiler, delayed the start of work still further. Only the explosion of 03 1046's St47K boiler in 1958 at Wünsdorf led to pressure from the then transport minister, Erwin Kramer (1902–1979), to get started on the Reko programme.

From 1959 onwards, 80 Class 41 locomotives were to be given the new 39E Reko boilers in the Zwickau and Karl Marx Stadt Reichsbahn repair shops (Reichsbahnausbesserungswerke or RAW).

As part of the rebuild, IfS/DR mixer preheaters, pressure-compensating piston valves (Trofimoff valves) and new Stühren ash pans were installed. The wider outer firebox needed new front walls to the driver's cab, the front windows of which were equipped with demisting equipment. For the larger and heavier VMP 15-20 compounded mixer pump (Verbundmischpumpe) a new pump mount had to be built. This and the new mixer preheater apparatus required a different arrangement for the main air reservoir. The outside cylinders with a diameter of just , originally designed for boiler pressures of 20 bar, were retained however. In the course of the rebuild, the brakes on the front carrying axle were removed.

The 39E Reko boiler fitted to the engines is a combustion chamber boiler and can generate 15 tons of steam per hour, thanks to the improved ratio of radiative to tube heating area. This is considerably higher than, for example, the new DB boiler which generates only 13.3 tons of steam per hour. Fitted with this boiler, the engine was able to exceed the performance requirements that it originally had for the 20 bar boilers, in spite of its small cylinders.

The engines rebuilt in this way are classified as Rekolokomotiven. Following their conversion, the DR gave all Class 41 locomotives the extra digit 1 under their 1970 renumbering scheme, so that e.g. number 41 122 became number 41 1122-5. In contrast to other classes, the Class 41 was not given a separate sub-class to distinguish Reko from non-Reko locomotives.

Class 41 Rekoloks could be seen in regular train service until 1988. The second oil crisis in 1979/80, and its effect on the GDR's economy, granted quite a number of Class 41 engines a short return to operational duties. Even several locomotives earmarked for scrapping were refurbished and were given a new general inspection service. The Meiningen repair shed refurbished a total of 23 locomotives of this class between 1980 and 1983. But by the end of September 1984, Oebisfelde shed withdrew the 41s and transferred its locomotives to Güsten shed. Göschwitz station, a satellite of Saalfeld shed was the next to send its 41s to the storage sidings in November 1986, and at the beginning of May 1988, Staßfurt (Bw Güsten) parted company with the last Class 41 locomotive, 41 1231, in regular service in the DR.

The Class 41 was the most versatile steam locomotive in the DR's engine fleet and hauled high-profile express and fast trains, as well as goods and passenger services.

Number 41 1185 was a DR heritage locomotive, now in the ownership of the Nuremberg Transport Museum.

As of 2009 the following are the only two operational locomotives remaining:

 41 1144  IGE Werrabahn-Eisenach e.V.
 41 1150  Bavarian Railway Museum (Nördlingen)
A further 8 Rekolokomotiven are in varying states of repair. See the list of preserved steam locomotives in Germany

Video

See also 
 List of DRG locomotives and railbuses

References

41
2-8-2 locomotives
41
Henschel locomotives
Krauss-Maffei locomotives
Krupp locomotives
Railway locomotives introduced in 1937
Borsig locomotives
Arnold Jung locomotives
Berliner locomotives
Esslingen locomotives
Standard gauge locomotives of Germany
1′D1′ h2 locomotives
Freight locomotives
Schichau-Werke locomotives